Matheus Bueno Batista (born 30 July 1998) is a Brazilian professional footballer who plays as an attacking midfielder for Portuguese club Gil Vicente.

Career
Matheus Bueno initially played amateur football, for a club called Novo Mundo in Curitiba. He was spotted in a friendly with Coritiba in early 2016 and ended up signing. In 2018 he worked with the under-20 team, and was part of the squad for the Copa São Paulo de Futebol Júnior before being promoted to the first team for the Campeonato Paranaense. In the final part of the 2018 Campeonato Brasileiro Série B season he made a return to the first team, making his national league debut as a substitute in a 5–2 defeat against São Bento on 6 November 2018.

On 22 June 2021, he signed a three-year contract with Portuguese club Gil Vicente in the Primeira Liga.

References

External links

1998 births
Living people
Brazilian footballers
Association football midfielders
Coritiba Foot Ball Club players
Gil Vicente F.C. players
Campeonato Brasileiro Série A players
Campeonato Brasileiro Série B players
Primeira Liga players
Brazilian expatriate footballers
Expatriate footballers in Portugal
Brazilian expatriate sportspeople in Portugal
Footballers from Curitiba